Iglesia de San Esteban (Sograndio) is a church in Sograndio, Asturias, Spain. It was established in the 12th century.

See also
Asturian art
Catholic Church in Spain

References

Churches in Asturias
12th-century establishments in the Kingdom of León
Religious organizations established in the 12th century
Bien de Interés Cultural landmarks in Asturias